Zavar Mahalleh (also Romanized as Zavār Maḩalleh) is a village in Mazkureh Rural District, in the Central District of Sari County, Mazandaran Province, Iran. At the 2006 census, its population was 264, in 69 families.

References 

Populated places in Sari County